Alfredo del Diestro (1885–1951) was Chilean actor and film director.

Selected filmography
Revolution (1933)
Prisoner 13 (1933) 
Godfather Mendoza (1934)
The Crying Woman (1933)
 Nothing More Than a Woman (1934)
 Juarez and Maximillian (1934)
 Gold and Silver (1934)
 Heroic Silence (1935)
 Neither Blood Nor Sand (1941)

References

Bibliography
 Charles Ramírez Berg. The Classical Mexican Cinema: The Poetics of the Exceptional Golden Age Films. University of Texas Press, 2015.

External links

1885 births
1951 deaths
Chilean male film actors
Chilean film directors
People from Valparaíso